The Department für Agrobiotechnology (IFA-Tulln) is one of the 15 departments of the University of Natural Resources and Life Sciences, Vienna (BOKU) operated in cooperation with the Vienna University of Technology and the University of Veterinary Medicine Vienna at the Campus Tulln Technopol.

History 
The IFA-Tulln was founded in 1994 as a joint research institution of three major universities in Vienna, the University of Veterinary Medicine Vienna (VetMed), the Vienna University of Technology (TUW) and the University of Natural Resources and Life Sciences Vienna (BOKU). The idea has been to enable the collaboration of scientists with complementary background in the interdisciplinary area of agrobiotechnology under one roof. Their expertise covers modern biotechnology in plant and animal production, environmental biotechnology, animal nutrition, food- and feed science and (bio) analytics and biopolymers. Today about 150 BOKU employees, guest scientists and students are working in 6 institutes at the IFA-Tulln which has become a department of the BOKU in 2004.

Organisation 
IFA-Tulln, which is a department of the University of Natural Resources and Life Sciences Vienna (BOKU), was founded in 1994 as a joint research institution of the BOKU, the University of Veterinary Medicine Vienna and the Vienna University of Technology to enable the collaboration of scientists with complementary background in the interdisciplinary area of agrobiotechnology.

The department is organised into 6 institutes:
 Institute for Biotechnology in Plant Production
 Institute for Natural Materials Technology
 Center for Analytical Chemistry
 Institute for Environmental Biotechnology
 Institute for Biotechnology in Animal Production
 Institute of Animal Nutrition, Products and Nutrition Physiology

Location 
The first 5 Institutes of the department IFA-Tulln are located in the IFA-Tulln building in Tulln an der Donau on the Campus Tulln Technopol. The sixth Institute (Institute of Animal Nutrition, Products and Nutrition Physiology) is located in Muthgasse, Vienna. The IFA-Tulln building, together with the other working groups of BOKU in the UFT-building (University Research Center Tulln), is forming the “BOKU location Tulln”. Campus Tulln Technopol is part of Technopol Tulln which was founded in 2006 by Ecoplus. Further partners of Technopol Tulln besides BOKU, are: AIT Austrian Institute of Technology, Technopark Tulln GmbH, Technologiezentrum Tulln GmbH, Agrana Research & Innovation Center, University for Applied Sciences Wiener Neustadt Campus Tulln and the city of Tulln.

Institutes at the Department IFA-Tulln

Institute for Biotechnology in Plant Production 
In its research, the Institute for Biotechnology in Plant Production focuses on basic and applied research in the areas plant breeding, plant genetics and phytopathology. The logical overlaps between these topics are plant-pathogen interaction, genetics of disease resistance and breeding research for disease resistance. The institute almost exclusively performs its own research work on agricultural crop plants.

Institute for Natural Materials Technology 
The research focuses on the utilization of natural resources as well as of idle waste material for reinforcements of polymers or for use as thermoplastic matrices. The main processing technologies used in composites- production are extrusion and injection moulding. To a lesser content the Institute also applies compression moulding.

Center for Analytical Chemistry 
The Center for Analytical Chemistry (CAC) is aiming to perform cutting edge scientific research and to develop advanced methods in the field of (bio)analytical chemistry. The CAC with its two Christian Doppler Laboratories is pursuing a highly interdisciplinary approach for the determination of chemical contaminants including mycotoxins and allergenic proteins in food. By employing metabolomics based approaches the CAC studies entire biological systems with a special emphasis on plant-fungi interactions.

There are five research groups within the Institute: 
 Metabolomics and Bioactive Substances
 Mycotoxins and Mycotoxin Metabolism
 Immunoanalytics and Food Allergens
 Water Analysis and Quality Assurance Systems
 Molecular Diagnostics

Institute for Environmental Biotechnology 
Focus of research activities at the Institute for Environmental Biotechnology is given to the application of microbial metabolism to safeguard the quality of life and preserve natural resources. On the one hand, emphasis is put on degradation or detoxification of pollutants (in soil, water and waste) or the development of monitoring methods to evaluate the success of restoration technologies. On the other hand, the best possible utilization of existing resources by establishment of sustainable material cycles is the central aim of research conducted. 
Practical application and process development for technical implementation are a primary concern independent from fundamental investigation of the underlying microbiological activities. Examples are the scale up of fermentation processes, the development of technical remediation methods and the testing of innovative combined biological-physical processes (e.g. use of membrane bioprocesses) in environmental technology.

There are 6 research groups established at the Institute for Environmental Biotechnology:
 Anaerobic digestion (biogas)
 Contaminated land management
 Feed additives
 Fermentation and pilot plant
 Microbiology (incl. molecular biology) and
 Water and wastewater treatment

Institute for Biotechnology in Animal Production 
With respect to methodological and research competence at the department IFA Tulln the institute for Biotechnology in Animal Production concentrates on advanced tissue culture technologies for the in vitro production of embryos. There are three research groups at the Institute for Biotechnology in Animal Production
 Proteomics of Gametes Maternal Interaction
 Genetics of mtDNA
 In vitro Production of Embryos

Institute of Animal Nutrition, Products and Nutrition Physiology 
The Institute of Animal Nutrition, Products, and Nutrition Physiology (APN) represents the start of the supply chain of food of animal origin. It focuses on adequate feeding of agricultural livestock and the significant impact of animal nutrition on quality and safety of primary products, such as milk, meat and eggs. Aside from nutrients, special emphasis is paid on secondary effects of feed and feed/food components on digestion, metabolism and health.

The Institute has condensed its mission and structure towards three intrinsic topics: 
 animal nutrition
 animal products
 nutrition physiology

References

Sources
Website of Dept. IFA-Tulln: http://www.ifa-tulln.ac.at or http://www.ifa-tulln.boku.ac.at
IFA-Tulln YouTube Channel: https://www.youtube.com/user/ifatulln?ob=5
Knowledge Survey of BOKU 2010
http://www.boku.ac.at/fileadmin/_/H13/Publikationen/Wissensbilanzen/Wissensbilanz_2010/BOKU_Wissensbilanz_2010.pdf
Knowledge Survey of BOKU 2009: http://www.boku.ac.at/fileadmin/_/mitteilungsblatt/MB_2009_10/MB19/BO_WB_2009_SCREEN.pdf
BOKU Research Database at BOKU: https://forschung.boku.ac.at/fis/suchen.orgeinheit_suchergebnis?sprache_in=de&menue_id_in=200&suchbegriff_in=H97&suchfeld_in=orgeinheit
Campus Tulln Technopol: www.technopol-tulln.at
Website of University for Natural Resources and Life Sciences, Vienna (BOKU): www.boku.ac.at
Website of the Technical University Vienna (TUW): www.tuwien.ac.at
University of Veterinary Medicine, Vienna (Vetmeduni Vienna): www.vu-wien.ac.at

Biotechnology organizations
Animal nutrition organizations
Research institutes in Austria